Acrocercops diffluella is a moth of the family Gracillariidae, known from Java, Indonesia, and Selangor, Malaysia, as well as India, Papua New Guinea, and the Solomon Islands. It was described by W. van Deventer in 1904. The hostplants for the species include Terminalia arjuna and Terminalia catappa.

References

diffluella
Moths of Asia
Moths described in 1904